Northernmost may refer to:
List of northernmost items
List of northernmost settlements
List of countries by northernmost point
Northernmost point of land

See also
Lists of extreme points